Froggy is a brand name radio format used for a variety of radio stations in the United States, most of which broadcast a country music format, with a few playing adult contemporary. (There was, however, an oldies-themed "Froggy" in Erie, Pennsylvania: the former WFGO; that station has since changed format and calls in 2007. Another oldies-based Froggy station, KFGI in Austin, Texas, changed formats in 1994.) Although the frog logo is shared among these stations, most of them are not associated with one another. The "Froggy" branding is particularly common among country stations currently or formerly owned by Forever Broadcasting or Forever Communications and Keymarketradio LLC, companies founded by Froggy creator Kerby Confer.

Origin
The Froggy format was conceived by Kerby Confer in 1988. Previously, Confer created a variety of country radio station brands such as "Kissin'" (KSSN in Little Rock, Arkansas) and "Beaver" (WBVR-FM in Bowling Green, Kentucky). "Froggy" was first installed on WFRG-FM in Utica, New York on February 1, 1988 with the branding "96 Frog". (The format and call letters have since switched frequencies and the station is now known as "Big Frog 104".) Other Froggy stations soon followed, including KFRG in Riverside-San Bernardino, California and WFGY in Altoona, Pennsylvania. For his work in developing the Froggy format, Confer was inducted into the Pennsylvania Radio Broadcasters Hall of Fame in 2003 and the Country Radio Hall of Fame in 2016.

General theme
The Froggy branded radio station uses jargon saturated with frog-related puns. Station disc jockey pseudonyms and program elements bear names making reference to things such as where the frog lives (in a pond), how a frog moves (hops), what noise a frog makes (cricket or ribbit), and other words that are related to frogs.

Examples of the "Froggy" theme use words like the following:
 "Hop-Line", "Frogcast", "Froggy Fotos", "Local Hoppenings", "Hoppy Birthday", "Froggy Fun Fones", "Froggyland", "in the swamp".
 Some of the stations incorporate the lingo into their coverage area. For example, WFGE in State College, Pennsylvania refers to Happy Valley, the area in and around State College, as "Hoppy Valley". Most also call their coverage area "Froggyland".
 An occasional "ribbit" between songs is used sometimes as a sweeper or in lieu of a jingle or dry segue.
 Listeners are encouraged to contact the station: "give us a ribbit on the hoplines".
 WFRG-FM in Utica, New York used to close out its weather "frogcast" with a jingle that sang "you sing 10 songs in a row and you're such a good friend of mine", to the tune of Three Dog Night's "Joy To The World", whose first line was "Jeremiah was a bullfrog".
 A few Froggy stations in Pennsylvania used a parody of "Mercury Blues": "Hey now Froggy/You sound so fine/Ridin' 'round in my Merc'y 49/Crazy 'bout my Froggy/I'm crazy 'bout my Froggy/Gonna turn up my Froggy, cruisin' up and down the road, uh-huh". These are called "Froggy Songs" that most stations play periodically throughout the day. WFGS in Murray, Kentucky previously offered some of the Froggy songs as free ringtones.

Logo
For the most part, the logo of a "Froggy" branded radio station is a smiling green frog. The font, color, position and angles can vary, however, the frog is generally green with a red tongue. The variations on the logo include the radio station's frequency as well as whether it is referred to as "Frog", "Big Frog", or "Froggyland".

DJ monikers
Many DJs at Froggy-branded stations (known as "frog jocks") use pseudonyms that reflect the branding:

 KVOX-FM in Fargo, North Dakota: Hopalong Cassidy, Anne Phibian, Hoppy Gilmore, Lilly Pad, Pete Moss, Jeremiah Bullfrog
 WFGY in Altoona, Pennsylvania: Frogman, Kellie Green, Tad Pole, Polly Wogg, Pete Moss, James Pond
 WFGE in State College, Pennsylvania: Boss Frog, Ann Phibian, Skeeter, Hopper, Sally Mander, Swampy
 WFGS in Murray, Kentucky: Marty McFlies, Gracie Hopper, Heather McRibbits, Kenny Lake
 WFRG-FM in Utica, New York: Annie Croakley, David Hopperfield, Joey Buttafroggo, Bean Pole, I. B. Green, Elvis Frogsley, Catfish Crawford
 WFRY-FM in Watertown, New York: James Pond & Cricket, Webb Foote, Bud Green, Jumpin' Jay, Pete Moss, Croakin' O Brian, Annie Croakley, Swim Mcgraw
 WOGY in Jackson, Tennessee: Tad Pole, Al Gee, Cricket

Many of the Froggy stations that have the country format use the syndicated evening program Lia, often putting "Leapin'" in front of her name to "frogify" her.

List of "Froggy" stations

In other media
The "Froggy" moniker is regularly lampooned on the Glenn Beck Program; Beck's alter ego, "Flap Jackson", is the morning jock at the fictional "109.9 The Big Frog".

On the US television series The Office, there is a Froggy 101 bumper sticker on the wall behind the reception desk and file cabinet, next to the desk of Dwight Schrute. The Office is set in Scranton, Pennsylvania, where WGGY uses the moniker "Froggy 101".

Related brands
Confer's daughter, Kristin Cantrell, established the Bigfoot Country brand for her stations when entering radio ownership. She also eventually acquired a prominent Froggy imitator, The Pig, in 2019. In October 2022, Cantrell's Seven Mountains Media purchased a majority of Forever Media's stations, including six Froggy stations.

See also
 KISS-FM, a top 40 radio brand owned by iHeartMedia
 Jack FM, an adult hits radio brand
 Bob FM, an adult hits radio brand
 WEBN, a rock station in Cincinnati that had a frog mascot named Tree B. Frog
 WIVK-FM, a country station in Knoxville, Tennessee that uses a frog as its logo, but a different "Froggy" package from other stations

References

External links

American radio networks
Franchised radio formats